Berithros was a town in ancient Troad mentioned by Stephanus of Byzantium.

Its site is unlocated.

References

Populated places in ancient Troad
Former populated places in Turkey
Lost ancient cities and towns